Kamel Bouhellal (born 24 June 1966) is an Algerian football manager.

References

1966 births
Living people
Algerian football managers
Paradou AC managers
RC Kouba managers
MC Alger managers
MC El Eulma managers
USM Blida managers
DRB Tadjenanet managers
RC Arbaâ managers
Algerian Ligue Professionnelle 1 managers
21st-century Algerian people